See also 50 goals in 50 games.

50 in 50: A collection of short stories, one for each of fifty years is a 2001 collection of short stories, so named since it includes fifty short stories written by Harry Harrison over fifty years. 

The contents are divided into:
 "Alien Shores"
 "Make Room! Make Room!"
 "Miraculous Inventions"
 "Laugh—I Thought I Would Cry"
 "Other Worlds"
 "R.U.R."
 "One for the Shrinks"
 "The Light Fantastic"
 "Square Pegs in Round Holes"

The closing section comprises eleven stories. These are the stories that defy easy categorization.

Notes

Sources
 Harrison, Harry. (2001). 50 in 50: A collection of short stories, one for each of fifty years. New York: TOR Books. ; OCLC 316247668

2001 short story collections
Short story collections by Harry Harrison
Tor Books books